Johannes Scheubel (18 August 1494 – 20 February 1570) was a German mathematician. His books include De Numeris et Diversis Rationibus (1545) and Algebrae Compendiosa (1551).

References

1494 births
1570 deaths
16th-century German mathematicians
16th-century German writers
16th-century German male writers